KSL Newsradio is a pair of radio stations serving the Salt Lake City, Utah region, consisting of the original AM station, KSL, licensed to Salt Lake City on 1160 kHz, and FM station KSL-FM, licensed to Midvale on 102.7 MHz. Owned by Bonneville International, a broadcasting subsidiary of the Church of Jesus Christ of Latter-day Saints, the stations share studios with sister television station KSL-TV in the Broadcast House building at the Triad Center in downtown Salt Lake City.

The AM station broadcasts with 50,000 watts non-directional, day and night, the maximum power permitted by the Federal Communications Commission. A Class A clear channel station, it covers most of north-central Utah in the daytime and can be heard in much of western North America at night. The KSL transmitter site is located west of Salt Lake City International Airport, while the KSL-FM transmitter is located on Farnsworth Peak in the Oquirrh Mountains, southwest of Salt Lake City.  

The AM station is Utah's primary entry point for the Emergency Alert System. Both KSL's AM and FM transmissions broadcast in HD Radio. KSL-FM carries the Latter-day Saints Channel over its HD2 subchannel.

Programming
Both stations simulcast a format of all-news during key hours on weekdays and talk programming the rest of the time.

Weekdays
Once a month during non-election cycles (usually on the last Thursday of the month), the Governor of Utah has airtime on the station for a "Let Me Speak to the Governor" segment, where calls are taken from constituents, with the governor answering questions and concerns.

A notable program from KSL's history was Herb Jepko's Nitecap [Radio Network], a call-in show airing overnight on 1160 KSL from 1964 to 1990.  Nightcaps was one of the first U.S. radio talk shows to be syndicated nationally, airing on numerous Mutual Broadcasting System Network stations.

Weekends
Programming airing on weekends includes KSL Outdoors, The KSL Greenhouse Show, Cougar Sports Saturday, The Movie Show Matinee, Best of The Doug Wright Show, Meet The Press, Ric Edelman as well as numerous LDS religious shows and paid programming.

KSL was the flagship station of Brigham Young University's football and men's basketball teams until BYU Radio took over the duties in 2017. KSL remains an affiliate for those teams though. Commentary for football games is provided by Greg Wrubell, the "Voice of the Cougars."

Due to its affiliation with the LDS Church, KSL, along with its television counterparts and other LDS-affiliated outlets in Utah, airs simulcasts of the General Conferences, held twice a year during April and October.

On Sunday mornings, KSL airs its longest-running show, Music and the Spoken Word, a weekly broadcast of The Tabernacle Choir at Temple Square which is also syndicated nationwide via CBS Radio and television. Continuously airing since 1929, it is one of the longest-running radio programs in the world, and one of only two radio shows to be inaugurated into the National Association of Broadcasters' Hall of Fame, along with the Grand Ole Opry.

On Sunday mornings and evenings for 22 years, KSL has broadcast "Religion Today" with host Martin Tanner, which focuses on Christian and Jewish history and doctrine.

History

KZN/KFPT/KSL 

Effective December 1, 1921, the U.S. Department of Commerce, in charge of radio at the time, adopted a regulation formally establishing a broadcasting station category, which set aside the wavelength of 360 meters (833 kHz) for entertainment broadcasts, and 485 meters (619 kHz) for farm market and weather reports.

On April 21, 1922, the Deseret News, a Salt Lake City newspaper owned by the Church of Jesus Christ of Latter-day Saints (LDS), was issued a license for a new station on both broadcasting wavelengths. This was the first broadcasting station licensed in the state of Utah. The new station's call sign was KZN. At this time call letters were generally randomly assigned from a roster of available call signs, but it is possible that the KZN call sign was derived from the Zion concept and common motif in the Latter Day Saint movement. 
The station was located on the roof of the Deseret News Building. KZN's first broadcast began at 3:00 p.m. on May 6, 1922, and included an 8:00 p.m. dedication address by LDS Church president Heber J. Grant, followed by a speech by Salt Lake City Mayor C. Clarence Nelson.

In 1924, KZN was sold to John Cope and his father, F.W. Cope, who formed the Radio Service Corporation of Utah. Ownership was changed to Cope & Johnson, and the station's frequency to 1120 kHz. The call letters became KFPT, with this new call sign coming from an alphabetical roster of available call letters that were normally assigned to new stations. KFPT, still located atop the Deseret New Building, made its formal debut on June 13, 1924. In early 1925 ownership was changed to the Radio Service Corporation of Utah, and the station's frequency to 1150 kHz.

On March 24, 1925, the call letters were changed from KFPT to KSL, and the frequency to 1000 kHz, with the "S" and "L" standing for "Salt Lake". (The KSL call sign had been assigned to a San Francisco station from March 1922 until it was deleted in June 1923.) Earl J. Glade (later a four-term mayor of Salt Lake City) joined the station in 1925 and guided KSL's operations for the next fourteen years. John F. Fitzpatrick, publisher of The Salt Lake Tribune (owned by the Kearns Corporation) acquired a quarter interest of KSL for a modest price, as did the LDS Church. This was the Tribune's first business partnership with the LDS Church, though the Church later reacquired full interest in the station. In 1927, the station moved to 990 kHz.

The recently formed Federal Radio Commission adopted General Order 40 in 1928, which included 40 "clear channel" allocations, which were assignments providing for high-powered stations with extensive nighttime coverage. The resulting reallocation was implemented on November 11, 1928, with KSL given one of the "clear channel" assignments, on 1130 kHz. An upgrade from 5,000 to the current 50,000 watts was dedicated October 22, 1932. In March 1941, with the implementation of the North American Regional Broadcasting Agreement, KSL was shifted to 1160 kHz, although it maintained its status as a "clear channel" station.

In 1932, KSL joined the CBS Radio Network. It remained with CBS until 2005, when it switched to ABC News Radio. The station gained a television counterpart in 1949, the CBS affiliate KSL-TV. (KSL-TV switched to NBC in 1995 after KUTV Channel 2 came under the ownership of CBS, following its acquisition by Westinghouse). These stations remained subsidiaries of the Deseret News until 1964, when Bonneville International Corporation was formed as the parent company for the LDS Church's broadcasting interests. 

In the mid-1980s KSL adopted an all-talk format, completely dropping music programming, aside from its Sunday broadcasts of the Tabernacle Choir.

KSL-FM

There have been two separate stations that have held the KSL-FM call letters. The original KSL-FM debuted in 1946 on the then sparsely-populated FM band at 100.1 (later 100.3) MHz. After simulcasting KSL for a number of years, the FM station switched to a beautiful music format, a contrast to the then-current KSL format of news and talk interspersed with middle of the road music. KSL-FM was sold to Simmons Family Inc. in 1977, due to FCC restrictions on multiple station ownership, and the new owners changed the call letters to KSFI. The ownership limitations were later loosened, and KSFI and KSL returned to common ownership in 2003 when Bonneville repurchased the station, along with classic rock KRSP-FM (103.5) and then-hot AC KQMB (102.7).

The second, and current KSL-FM, began broadcasting in 1985 as KQMB on 102.7 MHz. In September 2005, KQMB was converted to a simulcast of KSL, and changed its call letters to KSL-FM. The joint operation has been branded as "KSL Newsradio 102.7 FM & 1160 AM", though the AM signal was the main station. KQMB's former branding, call sign, and hot adult contemporary format were picked up by an unrelated company as 96.7 FM in Levan, Utah. But KQMB 96.7 has been flipped from hot adult contemporary format to classic hits format on November 16, 2021.

Personalities

Hosts

 Amanda Dickson, "Utah's Morning News", "A Woman's View"
 Tim Hughes, "Utah's Morning News","KSL Outdoors"
 Dave Noriega, "Dave and Dujanovic"
 Debbie Dujanovic, "Dave and Dujanovic"
 Maria Shilaos, "Utah's Noon News", "KSL Greenhouse Show"
 Boyd Matheson, "Inside Sources with Boyd Matheson"
 Jeff Caplan, "Jeff Caplan's Afternoon News"
 Alex Kirry, "Unrivaled" 
 Scott Mitchell, "Unrivaled"
 Steve Salles, "The KSL Movie Show"
 Doug Wright, "The KSL Movie Show"
 Greg Wrubell, "The Kalani Sitake Show", "The Dave Rose Show", BYU football & men's basketball game broadcasts, Voice of the BYU Cougars
 Lindsey Aerts, "The KSL Mom Show"
 Justin and Merrill Osmond, "Sound Advice"

Reporters, anchors & producers
 Don Brinkerhoff 
 Randall Jeppeson (Executive Producer, "Utah's Morning News" with Tim & Amanda)
 Marc Giauque (News Director)
 Mark Jackson
 Aimee Cobabe (Executive Producer, "Utah's Noon News")
 Heather Kelly
 Kira Hoffelmeyer (Executive Producer, "Jeff Caplan's Afternoon News")
 Nick Wyatt 
 Paul Nelson 
 Mary Richards
 Maria Shilaos (National News Desk)

Past personalities
 Parley Baer (1930s) Director of Special Events
 Grant Nielsen (retired), "Utah's Morning News"
 Paul James (retired), Voice of the BYU Cougars
 Rod Arquette, host of "Utah's Afternoon News" (now "Jeff Caplan's Afternoon News")
 Scott Seeger, host of "Utah's Afternoon News" (now "Jeff Caplan's Afternoon News")
 Mark Eubank (retired), KSL (radio) & KSL-TV meteorologist
 Rebecca Cressman, host of "Utah's Noon News"
 Doug Wright (retired), host of the "Doug Wright Show"
 Herb Jepko (1960s), known for his Nitecaps show

See also
 Bonneville International
 KSL-TV
 Media in Salt Lake City

References

External links
KSL NewsRadio

KSL

FCC History Cards for KSL (covering 1927-1980)

KSL-FM
KSL-FM in the FCC FM station database
KSL-FM on Radio-Locator
KSL-FM in Nielsen Audio's FM station database
FCC History Cards for KFSI (was KSL-FM from 1943 to 1978)

SL
Mass media in Salt Lake City
Bonneville International
Deseret Management Corporation
News and talk radio stations in the United States
Radio stations established in 1922
1922 establishments in Utah
Clear-channel radio stations
Radio stations licensed before 1923 and still broadcasting